Godwin Mensha (born 2 September 1989) is Nigerian professional footballer who plays as a striker for Mes Rafsanjan.

Club career

Malta
On 30 June 2000, Mensha joined Maltese Premier League side Balzan. However in the next January, his contract was terminated and he moved to fellow league team Mosta.

Paykan
On 27 July 2016, Mensha signed for Iranian club Paykan on a one-year contract. On 7 August, he made his debut in a 3–1 defeat against Tractor Sazi. On 20 September, Coming on as a substitute, he scored his first goals for Paykan, a brace in a 3–2 away win over defending champions Esteghlal Khuzestan. With 15 league goals, Mensha was the third highest scorer in the Premier League for the 2016–17 season, three goals behind Golden Boot winner Mehdi Taremi.

Persepolis
In May 2017, Mensha signed a contract with Pro League champions Persepolis. Mensha scored his first goal for the club on 3 August 2017, in a 2–1 victory against Tractor Sazi. On 22 August 2017, Mensha scored a crucial equalizer in Persepolis' 2–2 draw against Al Ahli in the first leg of the quarter-finals of the 2017 AFC Champions League. He scored his second goal for Persepolis from the penalty spot in an away match against Al Ahli.

Mensha scored seven goals in the AFC Champions League for Persepolis, making him fourth highest goalscorer for Persepolis in Asian competitions.

Esteghlal

In January 2019, Mensha and Persepolis came to a mutual agreement to terminate his contract with the club. He was then signed by cross-town rivals Esteghlal on an 18-month-long on 5 February 2019, making him the twentieth player to play for both clubs. After signing with the club, Mensha said: "I want to prove that I'm not wrong about joining Esteghlal." He was given the number 90 shirt, just as he was at Persepolis.

Mensha made his debut for the club on 7 February, in a 4–0 win against Paykan, as a 72nd-minute substitute for Dariush Shojaeian, assisting the third goal by Esmaël Gonçalves. On 28 February, in an away match against Foolad, he attacked an opponent fan after the fan pulled his hair while he was entering the stadium. During the match, he scored his first goal for his new club as well as providing an assist for the winner in the 3–1 away victory against Foolad. His goal came from Farshid Bagheri's pass from behind the halfway line, which he volleyed the ball past the keeper. Two days later, he was banned from all domestic football activities until further notice, due to the incident he had before the match. However, the ban was lifted a few days later after clarifying the incident for the FFIRI. On 5 May, with the arrival of new coach Farhad Majidi, he was excluded from training with the first-team due to his bad behaviour after he realised he is not a starter in the previous game against Padideh.

Ajman
On 11 July 2019, Mensha signed with UAE team Ajman on a two-year contract.

Gol Gohar
On 29 January 2020, Mensha returned to Iran signing with Gol Gohar Sirjan. He made his debut for the club on 1 February, coming on as a substitute for Mehrdad Bayrami in the 58th minute of a 1–1 draw against Pars Jonoubi Jam. Six days later he scored his first goal for the club in the 1–1 draw against Tractor.

Career statistics

1 Includes AFC Champions League matches.

Honours

Persepolis
Persian Gulf Pro League (1): 2017–18
Iranian Super Cup (2): 2017, 2018
AFC Champions League runner-up: 2018

Individual
 AFC Champions League Player of the Week: 2017 Semi-finals 2nd leg.

References

External links 

 Godwin Mensha at MSN Sports
 Godwin Mensha at PersianLeague
 
 Godwin Mensha at EuroSport
 

1989 births
Living people
Sportspeople from Lagos
Nigerian footballers
Nigerian expatriate footballers
SD Compostela footballers
Balzan F.C. players
Mosta F.C. players
Paykan F.C. players
Persepolis F.C. players
Esteghlal F.C. players
Ajman Club players
Segunda División B players
UD Socuéllamos players
Maltese Premier League players
Persian Gulf Pro League players
UAE Pro League players
Expatriate footballers in Spain
Expatriate footballers in Malta
Expatriate footballers in Iran
Expatriate footballers in the United Arab Emirates
Nigerian expatriate sportspeople in Spain
Nigerian expatriate sportspeople in Malta
Nigerian expatriate sportspeople in Iran
Nigerian expatriate sportspeople in the United Arab Emirates
Association football forwards